Is That a Gun in Your Pocket? is a 2016 American comedy film written and directed by Matt Cooper and starring Andrea Anders.

Cast
Andrea Anders as Jenna Keely
Matt Passmore as Glenn Keely
Cloris Leachman as Maxine
Katherine McNamara as Sandy Keely
John Michael Higgins as Mayor Wally
Horatio Sanz as Luis
Lauren Bowles as Barb Archer
John Heard as Sheriff Parsons
Christine Estabrook as Shirley Parsons
Kevin Conway as Cyrus
David Denman as Byron
Fernanda Romero as Connie
Max Lloyd-Jones as Dexter
Marshall Bell as Dwayne
Chad Buchanan as Keith

Reception
The film has a 0% rating on Rotten Tomatoes.  Mark Jenkins of The Washington Post gave it one star out of four.

See also
 Lysistrata

References

External links
 
 

American comedy films
2010s English-language films
2010s American films